Hellinsia betsiae is a moth of the family Pterophoridae that is found in Chile (Curico and Santiago).

The forewings are white with ad dark brown round spot at the base of the cleft. The hindwings are silvery grey‑white and the fringes are grey‑white. Adults are on wing in October, December and January.

References

betsiae
Moths described in 1991
Pterophoridae of South America
Fauna of Chile
Endemic fauna of Chile
Moths of South America